Ryan Clark (born June 23, 1979) is an American graphic designer and musician who also has performed under the stage name Maven. He is best known as the lead vocalist of the Christian metal band Demon Hunter, which he co-founded with his brother, guitarist Don Clark. He was also the frontman for Christian metalcore band Training for Utopia along with being one of the guitarists for Focal Point. He is featured on Zao's The Lesser Lights of Heaven DVD and Mark Salomon's Podcast, Never Was.

History 

Before Demon Hunter, Clark was a former guitarist of the short-lived Sacramento/Elk Grove, California-based hardcore punk band Focal Point.   Focal Point started in 1995 with the lineup of Clark, Robbie Imrisek (Vocals), Danny Dinh (Guitar), Kyle Brown (Bass), and Robert Torres (Drums). The band released a 7-inch via Life Sentence Records titled Neglected and a Studio album via Tooth and Nail Records.

Clark, then known as Maven, was the second vocalist for Training for Utopia. Don formed the band with the Rob Dennler (vocals), Steve Saxby (bass) and Morley Boyer (drums). Dennler left the band in 1996 and Clark joined the band. The band released an EP, a Split EP, and two studio albums.

He and his brother formed Demon Hunter in 2000 and released their debut album late the following year through Solid State Records. The group would continue to steadily gain exposure throughout the 2000s.

His grandfather, an artist, helped inspire his grandsons' work in graphic design, which is their true day job. Ryan and Don founded Seattle-based Asterik Studio with their friend Demetre Arges in 2000. The design studio has created CD packaging, poster art, web design, and/or merchandise design for hundreds of artists including Liz Phair, P.O.D., and The White Stripes; however, Clark also notes that he is not a fine artist and that such work is typically outsourced. Based on their design experience, Don and Ryan authored a chapter in the book New Masters of Photoshop, Volume 2. In 2007, the brothers had announced that they were leaving Asterik to start Invisible Creature. Ryan Clark is also art director of Solid State Records and its parent Tooth & Nail Records.

He has twice been nominated for a Grammy Award for his design work on Norma Jean's O God, the Aftermath and Fair's album The Best Worst-Case Scenario.

He currently is working on three side projects. One such project is with former Project 86 guitarist Randy Torres called NYVES. using funding through Kickstarter. In an interview with Billy Power, Matt Johnson (formerly of Blenderhead, The Out Circuit), said that He, Ryan, Don, and Johnson's brother-in-law, Nathan Burke (formerly of Frodus, The Out Circuit) and at one point, Sean Ingram (Coalesce) formed another project which was titled, Deathbed Atheist. The final project is a band with Jason Martin and originally Steven Dail who later quit, of Starflyer 59 called Low & Behold which released their debut album, Uppers in 2015 via Northern Records.

Bands 

Current
 Demon Hunter – vocals (2000–present), guitar (2000–2002)
 Low & Behold – vocals (2010–present)
 NYVES – vocals (2014–present)
 Deathbed Atheist – guitar (2000–present)

Former
 Focal Point – guitar (1995–1997)
 Training for Utopia – vocals, guitar (1996–2000)

Discography 
Focal Point
 Neglected EP (1996)
 Suffering of the Masses (1996)

Training for Utopia
The Falling Cycle EP (1997)
Plastic Soul Impalement (1998)
Training for Utopia / Zao (1998 w/ Zao)
Throwing a Wrench into the American Music Machine (1999)
Technical Difficulties (2004)

Demon Hunter
Demon Hunter (2002)
Summer of Darkness (2004)
The Triptych (2005)
Storm the Gates of Hell (2007)
The World Is a Thorn (2010)
True Defiance (2012)
Extremist (2014)
Outlive (2017)
War (2019)
Peace (2019)
Songs of Death and Resurrection (2021)
Exile (2022)

Low & Behold
Blood Red (2011)
Uppers (2015)

NYVES
Anxiety (2015)
Pressure (EP) (2016)

Guest appearances 

As Maven
 Zao – Training for Utopia / Zao (1998) (guest vocals – "Skin Like Winter")

As Ryan Clark
 Kutless – Sea of Faces (2004) (guest vocals – "Let You In")
 Falling Up – Crashings (2004) (guest vocals – "Jackson 5")
 Anberlin – Never Take Friendship Personal (2005) (guest vocals – "Never Take Friendship Personal")
 Becoming the Archetype – Terminate Damnation (2005) (guest vocals – "Elegy: Deception/Lament/Triumph")
 Advent – Remove The Earth (2008) (guest vocals – "Hanging the Giants")
 Becoming the Archetype – Dichotomy (2008) (guest vocals – "Dichotomy (The Tower)")
 Trenches – The Tide Will Swallow Us Whole (2008) (guest vocals – "Calling")
 Sleeping Giant – Sons of Thunder (2009) (guest vocals – "Army of the Chosen One")
 Nine Lashes – World We View (2012) (guest vocals – "Our Darkest Day")
 Impending Doom – Baptized In Filth (2012) (guest vocals – "My Light Unseen")
 Living Sacrifice – Ghost Thief (2013) (guest vocals – "Screwtape")
 Monsterns – (2013) (guest vocals – "Monster Life")
 Shonlock – A Night to Remember (2014) (guest vocals – "Don't Play")
 Five Finger Death Punch – The Wrong Side of Heaven and the Righteous Side of Hell Volume 1 & 2 Ultimate Collector's Box Set (2014) (guest vocals – "Weight Beneath My Sin" (alternate version))
 Sleeping Giant – I Am (2018) (guest vocals – "Fly. Fight. Crow.")
 The Out Circuit – Enter the Ghost (2018) (guest vocals – "Book of the Void")
 Set the Sun – In Absentia, Vol. 1 (2021) (guest vocals – "Invisible")
 Becoming the Archetype – Children of the Great Extinction (2022) (guest vocals – "The Ruins")

References

External links

1979 births
Living people
American graphic designers
American heavy metal singers
American performers of Christian music
Christian metal musicians
21st-century American singers
21st-century American male singers
Demon Hunter members